Borovik (transliteration from Russian) or Borovyk (transliteration from Ukrainian). The word literally refers to any mushroom of the genus Boletus. The Polish-language equivalent is  Borowik.

Notable people with this surname include:

Alexandre Borovik (born 1956), UK professor of mathematics
Artyom Borovik (1960–2000), Russian journalist
Dimitri Borovik (born 1974), Estonian biathlete
Genrikh Borovik (born 1929), Russian journalist
Oleh Borovyk (born 1996) is a Ukrainian sprint canoer
Sasha Borovik (born 1968), American and European lawyer
 Sevğil Musayeva-Borovyk, Ukrainian journalist from Crimea, Ukraine
Yevhen Borovyk (born 1985), Ukrainian footballer

See also

Borovic